Casterton is a small village and civil parish close to Kirkby Lonsdale on the River Lune in the south east corner of Cumbria, England. In the 2001 census the parish had a population of 500, decreasing at the 2011 census to 425.

The parish is bounded by Kirkby Lonsdale, Barbon, Dent, Leck and Burrow-with-Burrow, and lies just inside the western edge of the Yorkshire Dales National Park: much of the Three Counties System, the longest explored natural cave system in the country, lies beneath it. The western boundary, towards Kirkby Lonsdale, is formed by the river and has one of the finest medieval bridges in the country, one of those known as Devil's Bridge and a local landmark.

The name of the village hints at a Roman camp, though no evidence of that has been found, but the major Roman Ribchester to Carlisle road runs to the east of the village and a cross-stone was ploughed up and reerected in the 19th century. A stone circle can be seen to the east, on top of a ridge on the flanks of Brownthwaite Pike.

The Ingleton Branch Line of the Lancaster and Carlisle Railway ran through the village before its closure under the Beeching axe in the mid 1960s.

The largest buildings in the village are at Casterton School, a private girls' school.  The school was founded in 1820 by William Carus-Wilson as a school for servants and teachers.  Carus-Wilson also founded the Clergy Daughters' School three years later at Cowan Bridge, Burrow-with-Burrow. The two schools were amalgamated on the present site in 1833. The Brontë sisters attended the Clergy Daughters' School on its original site and Lowood school in Jane Eyre is based on it.

The village Church of Holy Trinity, was also built under Carus-Wilson and was consecrated on 5 October 1833 by the Bishop of Chester. It was enlarged in 1865 and restored in 1891, and is at present run as part of the 'Rainbow Parish' based in Kirkby Lonsdale, a combination of eight, originally seven, churches.

Casterton has a private 9-hole golf course; an 18th-century coaching inn, The Pheasant Inn; a bus shelter for the weekly bus; and a phone box.

See also

Listed buildings in Casterton, Cumbria

References

External links

 Cumbria County History Trust: Casterton (nb: provisional research only – see Talk page)

Casterton School
Casterton Holy Trinity Church

Villages in Cumbria
Civil parishes in Cumbria